The 1971 Seton Hall Pirates baseball team represented Seton Hall University in the 1971 NCAA University Division baseball season. The Pirates played their home games at Owen T. Carroll Field. The team was coached by Ownie Carroll in his 25th year as head coach at Seton Hall.

The Pirates won the District II Playoff to advance to the College World Series, where they were defeated by the Texas–Pan American Broncs.

Roster

Schedule

|-
! style="" | Regular Season
|-

|-
! bgcolor="#DDDDFF" width="3%" | #
! bgcolor="#DDDDFF" width="7%" | Date
! bgcolor="#DDDDFF" width="14%" | Opponent
! bgcolor="#DDDDFF" width="25%" | Site/Stadium
! bgcolor="#DDDDFF" width="5%" | Score
! bgcolor="#DDDDFF" width="5%" | Overall Record
! bgcolor="#DDDDFF" width="5%" | Metro Record
|- align="center" bgcolor="#ffcccc"
| 1 || March  ||  || Unknown • Unknown || 2–3 || 0–1 || 0–1
|- align="center" bgcolor="#ccffcc"
| 2 || March  ||  || Unknown • Unknown || 7–6 || 1–1 || 1–1
|-

|-
! bgcolor="#DDDDFF" width="3%" | #
! bgcolor="#DDDDFF" width="7%" | Date
! bgcolor="#DDDDFF" width="14%" | Opponent
! bgcolor="#DDDDFF" width="25%" | Site/Stadium
! bgcolor="#DDDDFF" width="5%" | Score
! bgcolor="#DDDDFF" width="5%" | Overall Record
! bgcolor="#DDDDFF" width="5%" | Metro Record
|- align="center" bgcolor="#ccffcc"
| 3 || April 2 || at  || Unknown • Piscataway, New Jersey || 5–8 || 1–2 || 1–1
|- align="center" bgcolor="#ccffcc"
| 4 || April  ||  || Unknown • Unknown || 5–0 || 2–2 || 2–1
|- align="center" bgcolor="#ffcccc"
| 5 || April  ||  || Unknown • Unknown || 6–10 || 2–3 || 2–1
|- align="center" bgcolor="#ffcccc"
| 6 || April  ||  || Owen T. Carroll Field • South Orange, New Jersey || 0–3 || 2–4 || 2–2
|- align="center" bgcolor="#ccffcc"
| 7 || April  ||  || Unknown • Unknown || 8–2 || 3–4 || 3–2
|- align="center" bgcolor="#ccffcc"
| 8 || April  ||  || Unknown • Unknown || 6–5 || 4–4 || 3–2
|- align="center" bgcolor="#ffcccc"
| 9 || April  ||  || Unknown • Unknown  || 1–4 || 4–5 || 3–2
|- align="center" bgcolor="#ffcccc"
| 10 || April  || Fairleigh Dickinson || Unknown • Unknown || 3–2 || 5–5 || 4–2
|- align="center" bgcolor="#ccffcc"
| 11 || April 18 || Rutgers || Owen T. Carroll Field • South Orange, New Jersey || 7–2 || 6–5 || 4–2
|- align="center" bgcolor="#ccffcc"
| 12 || April  || Wagner || Unknown • Unknown || 4–0 || 7–5 || 5–2
|- align="center" bgcolor="#ccffcc"
| 13 || April  || St. Francis (NY) || Unknown • Unknown || 11–5 || 8–5 || 6–2
|- align="center" bgcolor="#ffcccc"
| 14 || April  ||  || Unknown • Unknown || 2–9 || 8–6 || 6–2
|- align="center" bgcolor="#ffcccc"
| 15 || April  ||  || Unknown • Unknown || 1–7 || 8–7 || 6–3
|- align="center" bgcolor="#ffcccc"
| 16 || April 25 ||  || Owen T. Carroll Field • South Orange, New Jersey || 8–9 || 8–8 || 6–3
|- align="center" bgcolor="#ccffcc"
| 17 || April  ||  || Unknown • Unknown || 9–8 || 9–8 || 6–3
|- align="center" bgcolor="#ffcccc"
| 18 || April  || Manhattan || Unknown • Unknown || 2–4 || 9–9 || 6–4

|-
! bgcolor="#DDDDFF" width="3%" | #
! bgcolor="#DDDDFF" width="7%" | Date
! bgcolor="#DDDDFF" width="14%" | Opponent
! bgcolor="#DDDDFF" width="25%" | Site/Stadium
! bgcolor="#DDDDFF" width="5%" | Score
! bgcolor="#DDDDFF" width="5%" | Overall Record
! bgcolor="#DDDDFF" width="5%" | Metro Record
|- align="center" bgcolor="#ccffcc"
| 19 || May  ||  || Unknown • Unknown || 15–1 || 10–9 || 6–4
|- align="center" bgcolor="#ffcccc"
| 20 || May  ||  || Unknown • Unknown || 4–5 || 10–10 || 6–5
|- align="center" bgcolor="#ffcccc"
| 21 || May  ||  || Unknown • Unknown || 3–8 || 10–11 || 6–5
|- align="center" bgcolor="#ccffcc"
| 22 || May  ||  || Unknown • Unknown || 5–1 || 11–11 || 7–5
|- align="center" bgcolor="#ccffcc"
| 23 || May  || Manhattan || Unknown • Unknown || – || 12–11 || 8–5
|-

|-
! style="" | Postseason
|-

|-
! bgcolor="#DDDDFF" width="3%" | #
! bgcolor="#DDDDFF" width="7%" | Date
! bgcolor="#DDDDFF" width="14%" | Opponent
! bgcolor="#DDDDFF" width="25%" | Site/Stadium
! bgcolor="#DDDDFF" width="5%" | Score
! bgcolor="#DDDDFF" width="5%" | Overall Record
! bgcolor="#DDDDFF" width="5%" | Metro Record
|- align="center" bgcolor="#ffcccc"
| 24 || May  || Iona || Unknown • Unknown || 1–2 || 12–12 || 8–5
|- align="center" bgcolor="#ccffcc"
| 25 || May  || Iona || Unknown • Unknown || 6–1 || 13–12 || 8–5
|- align="center" bgcolor="#ccffcc"
| 26 || May  || Iona || Unknown • Unknown || 15–6 || 14–12 || 8–5
|-

|-
! bgcolor="#DDDDFF" width="3%" | #
! bgcolor="#DDDDFF" width="7%" | Date
! bgcolor="#DDDDFF" width="14%" | Opponent
! bgcolor="#DDDDFF" width="25%" | Site/Stadium
! bgcolor="#DDDDFF" width="5%" | Score
! bgcolor="#DDDDFF" width="5%" | Overall Record
! bgcolor="#DDDDFF" width="5%" | Metro Record
|- align="center" bgcolor="#ccffcc"
| 27 || May  || vs  || Bill Clarke Field • Princeton, New Jersey || 3–1 || 15–12 || 8–5
|- align="center" bgcolor="#ccffcc"
| 28 || May  || vs  || Bill Clarke Field • Princeton, New Jersey || 8–1 || 16–12 || 8–5
|- align="center" bgcolor="#ccffcc"
| 29 || May  || Saint Joseph's || Bill Clarke Field • Princeton, New Jersey || 4–1 || 17–12 || 8–5
|-

|-
! bgcolor="#DDDDFF" width="3%" | #
! bgcolor="#DDDDFF" width="7%" | Date
! bgcolor="#DDDDFF" width="14%" | Opponent
! bgcolor="#DDDDFF" width="25%" | Site/Stadium
! bgcolor="#DDDDFF" width="5%" | Score
! bgcolor="#DDDDFF" width="5%" | Overall Record
! bgcolor="#DDDDFF" width="5%" | Metro Record
|- align="center" bgcolor="#ffcccc"
| 30 || June 8 || vs Southern California || Omaha Municipal Stadium • Omaha, Nebraska || 1–5 || 17–13 || 8–5
|- align="center" bgcolor="#ffcccc"
| 31 || June 10 || vs  || Omaha Municipal Stadium • Omaha, Nebraska || 2–8 || 17–14 || 8–5
|-

|-
|

References

Seton Hall Pirates
Seton Hall Pirates baseball seasons
Seton Hall Pirates baseball
College World Series seasons